Hipólito Gil (14 July 1904 – 14 October 1998) was an Argentine sailor. He competed in the 8 Metre event at the 1936 Summer Olympics.

References

External links
 

1904 births
1998 deaths
Argentine male sailors (sport)
Olympic sailors of Argentina
Sailors at the 1936 Summer Olympics – 8 Metre
Place of birth missing